Idrettslaget Nansen is a Norwegian sports club from Dalsbygda in Os, Hedmark, founded in 1898.

World-level cross-country skiers Annar Ryen and Therese Johaug have been members of the club.

References

Sports teams in Norway
Sports clubs established in 1898
Sport in Hedmark